La Consolacion College Biñan also referred to by its acronym LCCBn is a private, Catholic, co-educational basic and higher education institution owned and administered by the Augustinian Sisters of Our Lady of Consolation (ASOLC) in Sto. Tomas, City of Biñan, Laguna, Philippines. It was founded by the Augustinian Sisters in 1985.

Historical background and perspective

History
It was in 1984 when the students of La Consolacion College, Mendiola, Manila conducted an educational survey in Biñan, Laguna, particularly in Barrio Sto. Tomas where many housing projects were being established. The need for a new school was seen based on the results of the survey. Hence, the Augustinian Sisters of Our Lady of Consolation decided to extend their educational efforts through the establishment of a school in Biñan in 1984.

The school initially offered Kinder I and II and Grades I to IV when it started operations in June 1985. The Sto. Niño Building, now known as St. Monica Building, housed 323 pupils in its initial operation. Also during this year, the Administrative, Supervisory and Non-Teaching Personnel were composed of the President of La Consolacion College, Manila, the Principal, 3 Teaching Sisters, 3 Lay Teachers, a Sister in-charge of the canteen, a janitor, a night security guard, a clerk and 2 aides.

Due to the increase in population, another edifice was built the following year.  It was named Our Lady of Consolation Building which was later changed to St. Augustine Building.  Additional basic education levels were offered i.e. Grade V to First Year High School.

The school year 1988-1989 facilitated the construction of the Pre-School building and the Sisters’ Cloister as answer to the need of a more growing population which registered 1,067 and 185 enrollees for the Elementary and High School Departments, respectively.

Campus
St. Monica Building
St. Augustine Building
Our Lady of Consolation Building
Food Court
Auditorium
Mo. Rita Barcelo Building
Sto. Niño Building
Mo. Consuelo Barcelo Building
Gymnasium

Academic programs
Basic Education Department
Pre-school Education, Kinder I and II
Elementary Education (Grade 1–6)
Secondary Education (Grade 7–10)
College Department
School of Business Administration
Bachelor of Science in Business Administration
Major in Management Accounting
Major in Marketing Management
School of Computer Studies
Bachelor of Science in Computer Science
School of Hospitality Management
Bachelor of Science in Hospitality Management
Major in Hotel and Restaurant Management
Major in Tourism
School of Liberal Arts
Bachelor of Arts in Psychology

Institutional affiliations
Catholic Educational Association of the Philippines

See also
La Consolacion College - Baao, Camarines Sur
La Consolacion College - Bacolod, Negros Occidental
La Consolacion College - Daet, Camarines Norte
La Consolacion College - Iriga, Camarines Sur
La Consolacion College – Manila, Metro Manila
 La Consolacion College – Novaliches - Caloocan, Metro Manila
La Consolacion University Philippines, Malolos, Bulacan

References

Universities and colleges in Laguna (province)
Augustinian schools
Augustinian universities and colleges
Education in Biñan
Catholic elementary schools in the Philippines
Catholic secondary schools in the Philippines
Catholic universities and colleges in the Philippines